Long Beach is a city in Pacific County, Washington, United States. The population was 1,392 at the 2010 census.

History
Long Beach began when Henry Harrison Tinker bought a land claim from Charles E. Reed in 1880.  He platted the town and called it "Tinkerville."  Long Beach was officially incorporated on January 18, 1922. From 1889 to 1930, a narrow-gauge railroad called the Ilwaco Railway and Navigation Company ran up the whole peninsula.

The Long Beach depot was built between First and Second Streets on the east side of the track, which ran north along "B" Street.  A major destination in Long Beach was Tinker's Hotel, later renamed the Long Beach Hotel, and built very close to the station.  This was the second hotel built at the site by Henry Harrison Tinker, the founder of Long Beach.  Tinker's first hotel burned down in 1894.  He built another one just a few feet to the east and south of the rail depot. The image in the gallery shows a crowd waiting for the train sometime between 1901 and 1907.  Just across the tracks (which doubled in this area) from Tinker's Hotel in Long Beach was the Portland Hotel.  The Portland Hotel, owned by the Hanniman family featured an enormous round (and unique) turret-like structure.  The Portland Hotel burned down on December 6, 1914, and was not replaced.  The Driftwood Hotel was another common Long Beach destination.

The boardwalk area near the station was known as "Rubberneck Row."  Businesses existing in August 1911 that can be identified along Rubberneck Row from photographs (see images in this article) include, on the west side of the tracks, an establishment advertising "Baths" (possibly the Crystal Baths, an indoor swimming pool), Milton York Candies, a "Postal Shop," and a soda fountain just across from the station advertising "Milk Shake."  A somewhat earlier photograph shows a sign for a livery stable immediately to the west across the tracks from Tinker's Hotel, followed (proceeding southwards) by a barber shop, "Vincent's Souvenirs," and "The Candy Man".  A banner stretching above the tracks advertises a restaurant.  The photo published by Feagans shows it was produced by H.A. Vincent, Ilwaco and Long Beach, who was probably the owner of Vincent's Souvenirs. Then, in the late 1980s, Marsh's Free Museum was made, to show people the wonders of the Northwest.

Geography
Long Beach is located at  (46.350959, -124.053643) on the Long Beach Peninsula.

Climate
According to the Köppen climate classification system, Long Beach and the Long Beach Peninsula have a moist, cool oceanic climate (Cfb). Both extreme heat and extreme cold are rare. Snow is far less common than rain, but can happen every once in a while.

Earthquake and tsunami vulnerability

If a magnitude 9.0 earthquake were to hit the Cascadia subduction zone, emergency planners estimate the first tsunami waves could hit Long Beach 20 to 25 minutes later. 

At a December 2016 open house, the city government presented initial plans for a proposed  berm which could potentially accommodate 850 persons.  The structure would have had a "modified prow," much like a ship looking out to sea.  The shape was also designed to withstand the backwash from a tsunami.  The total cost was estimated at $3.4 million, of which the Federal Emergency Management Agency (FEMA) was to pay 75%, the Emergency Management Division of Washington State 12.5%, and the City of Long Beach 12.5%. The project was abandoned in 2017 after new scientific reports indicated it was designed at least  too short to withstand a worst-case tsunami.

Demographics

2010 census
As of the census of 2010, there were 1,392 people, 726 households, and 342 families residing in the city. The racial makeup of the city was 91.5% White, 0.1% African American, 0.8% Native American, 1.3% Asian, 0.2% Pacific Islander, 3.7% from other races, and 2.5% from two or more races. Hispanic or Latino of any race were 7.7% of the population.

There were 726 households, of which 15.4% had children under the age of 18 living with them, 33.9% were married couples living together, 9.1% had a female householder with no husband present, 4.1% had a male householder with no wife present, and 52.9% were non-families. 44.8% of all households were made up of individuals, and 18.8% had someone living alone who was 65 years of age or older. The average household size was 1.85 and the average family size was 2.54.

The median age in the city was 50.1 years. 14.5% of residents were under the age of 18; 8.5% were between the ages of 18 and 24; 20.1% were from 25 to 44; 32.1% were from 45 to 64; and 24.6% were 65 years of age or older. The gender makeup of the city was 47.8% male and 52.2% female.

2000 census
As of the census of 2000, there were 1,283 people, 660 households, and 314 families residing in the city. The population density was 1,018.7 people per square mile (393.2/km2). There were 1,155 housing units at an average density of 917.1 per square mile (353.9/km2). The racial makeup of the city was 89.87% White, 0.08% African American, 1.09% Native American, 1.40% Asian, 1.56% from other races, and 6.00% from two or more races. Hispanic or Latino of any race were 4.83% of the population. 19.6% were of German, 11.5% Irish, 10.3% English, 6.3% American and 5.7% Norwegian ancestry according to Census 2000.

There were 660 households, out of which 17.0% had children under the age of 18 living with them, 34.2% were married couples living together, 11.8% had a female householder with no husband present, and 52.3% were non-families. 43.8% of all households were made up of individuals, and 20.5% had someone living alone who was 65 years of age or older. The average household size was 1.92 and the average family size was 2.63.

In the city, the population was spread out, with 17.6% under the age of 18, 5.8% from 18 to 24, 23.1% from 25 to 44, 28.9% from 45 to 64, and 24.5% who were 65 years of age or older. The median age was 47 years. For every 100 females, there were 81.2 males. For every 100 females age 18 and over, there were 77.9 males.

The median income for a household in the city was $23,611, and the median income for a family was $33,029. Males had a median income of $30,938 versus $20,625 for females. The per capita income for the city was $21,266. About 13.4% of families and 18.7% of the population were below the poverty line, including 19.5% of those under age 18 and 11.4% of those age 65 or over.

Gallery

See also
Clark's Tree
Washington State International Kite Festival
KLMY

References

External links

 City of Long Beach

Cities in Washington (state)
Cities in Pacific County, Washington
Populated coastal places in Washington (state)
Longest beaches